Syncosmia patinata is a moth in the family Geometridae. It is found in the north-eastern Himalayas.

References

Moths described in 1897
Eupitheciini